Philippe Paré (born 24 August 1935) is a former member of the House of Commons of Canada, in which he served from 1993 to 1997. His career has been in education.

Born in Montmagny, Quebec, he was elected in the Louis-Hébert electoral district under the Bloc Québécois party in the 1993 federal election, thus he served in the 35th Canadian Parliament. He did not seek a second term in office and therefore left Canadian politics following the 1997 federal election.

References 
 

1935 births
Bloc Québécois MPs
Living people
Members of the House of Commons of Canada from Quebec
People from Montmagny, Quebec